Nughab castle is a historical castle located in Birjand County in South Khorasan Province; the longevity of this fortress dates back to the 12th to 14th centuries AH.

References 

Castles in Iran